Willowbee is a short film  released in 2004. It was written and directed by George Kenyon. The film was premiered at the Aspen Film Festival on 6 February 2004. It was also featured at the 2005 US Comedy Arts Festival.

Cast
Seth Binzer - Lead
Amy Smart - Burglar

References

External links
 

2004 short films
2004 films
American short films
2000s English-language films